Zoio is a civil parish in the municipality of Bragança, Portugal. The population in 2011 was 189, in an area of 24.39 km².

References

Parishes of Bragança, Portugal